Põld is an Estonian surname (meaning field), and may refer to:

 Anna-Liisa Põld (born 1990), swimmer
 Georg Erich Põld (born 1952), politician
 Peeter Põld (1878–1930), pedagogic scientist, school director and politician
 Remy Põld (born 1992), basketball player

Estonian-language surnames